The resm-i sicill was a tax in the Ottoman empire; it was a fixed fee for recording a case in a kadı's records.

References

Taxation in the Ottoman Empire